MOONDUST is the nineteenth studio album by Japanese alternative rock band The Pillows. It was released on October 22, 2014, and marks the band's 25th anniversary.

Track listing

References 

The Pillows albums
2014 albums